The discography of BadBadNotGood, the Canadian instrumental jazz and hip-hop group, includes five solo studio albums as well as collaborative projects like 2015's Sour Soul with Ghostface Killah, and numerous singles. Collaborative since their origin, BBNG is well known for working with artists like Daniel Caesar, MF DOOM, Kali Uchis, and Mick Jenkins. Outside of their own output, BBNG are noted producers and songwriters and often work with fellow Canadian producers Frank Dukes and Kaytranada.

Albums

Studio albums

Collaborative albums

Live albums 
 BBNGLive 1 (self-released, 2011)
 BBNGLive 2 (self-released, 2012)
 Spotify Live EP (Innovative Leisure, 2017)

Mixtapes 
 BadBadNotGood (self-released, June 2011)

DJ mixes 
 Lex Mix: BadBadNotGood Doom Mix (Lex Records, 2013)
LateNightTales: BadBadNotGood (LateNightTales, 2017)

Singles

As lead artist 

Promotional singles
 "CS60" / "Confessions" (2014) (from III)
"Triangle" / "Can't Leave the Night" (Live in the Red Bull Studio LA) (2014)
 "Six Degrees" (featuring Danny Brown) / "Tone's Rap (Instrumental)" (from Sour Soul with Ghostface Killah) (2014)
 "Time Moves Slow" (featuring Samuel T. Herring) (2016) (from IV)
"In Your Eyes" (featuring Charlotte Day Wilson) (2016) (from IV)

Split singles 
Adapted from Jaxsta.

As featured artist 
Adapted from Jaxsta.

Other charting songs

Guest appearances 
Adapted from Jaxsta.

Remixes and covers 
Much of the early hype around the band focused on their cover versions of popular hip hip and electronica songs which populated their first two studio albums and live records, released in 2011 and 2012. Since that time, the group has produced official covers/remixes (sometimes billed as 'reinterpretations') for other artists across genres and have occasionally released covers as bonus tracks or singles for special projects.

Official remixes

List of covers performed 
Listed as artist covered, song, BBNG releases/versions

2011–2012

 Odd Future / Gucci Mane – "The Medley" ("Bastard," "Lemonade," "AssMilk") (Odd Future Sessions, BBNG EP, BBNGLIVE 1, 2011; BBNGLIVE 2, BBNG2, 2012)
 Tyler, The Creator – "Session" (Odd Future Sessions, 2011)
 Tyler, The Creator – "Goblin Medley" ("Untitled 63," "Nightmare," "Yonkers") (Odd Future Sessions, BBNG EP, BBNGLIVE 1, 2011)
 A Tribe Called Quest – "Electric Relaxation" (BBNG EP, BBNGLIVE 1, 2011)
 Waka Flocka Flame – "Hard in the Paint" (BBNG EP, BBNGLIVE 1, BBNGSINGLE, 2011; BBNGLIVE 2, 2012)
 Tyler, The Creator – "Seven" / "Fish" / "Orange Juice" with Tyler, The Creator (Tyler, The Creator x BadBadNotGood unofficial sessions, 2011)
 Slum Village – "Fall in Love" (BBNG, BBNGLIVE 1, 2011)
 Gang Starr / Joy Division – "Mass Appeal / Transmission" (BBNG, 2011)
 Nas / Ol' Dirty Bastard – "The World Is Yours / Brooklyn Zoo" (BBNG, BBNGLIVE 1, 2011)
 Flying Lotus – "Camel" (BBNG, BBNGLIVE 1, 2011)
 The Legend of Zelda – "Title Theme / Saria's Song / Song of Storms" (BBNG, 2011)
 Tyler, The Creator – "She" (unofficial single)
 ASAP Rocky – "Peso" (live dates, 2011–2012)
 MF Doom / Madlib – "DOOM" (medley: "Supervillian Theme," "Fazers," and "Vomitspit") (single, BBNGLIVE 1, 2011)
 Joy Division – "Disorder" (BBNGLIVE 1, 2011)
 Earl Sweatshirt – Earl" feat. Leland Whitty (BBNG2, 2012)
 Feist / James Blake cover – "Limit to Your Love" (BBNGLIVE 2, BBNG2, 2012)
 James Blake – "CMYK" (BBNGLIVE 2,  BBNG2, 2012)
 Kanye West – "Flashing Lights" (BBNG2, 2012)
 My Bloody Valentine – "You Made Me Realise" feat. Luan Phung (BBNG2, 2012)
 Soulja Boy – "Pretty Boy Swag Remix" (unofficial single, 2012)
2013–present
 Flying Lotus – "Putty Boy Strut" (tour 2013–2016; Spotify Live, 2017)
TNGHT – "Bugg'n" (tour, 2013–2015)
MF Doom & Jneiro Jarel – "Guv'nor (BadBadNotGood Version)" (Keys to the Kuffs (Butter Edition), 2013; Bookhead EP, 2014)
 Freddie Gibbs & Madlib – "Shame" (III bonus track, 2014)
 Future Islands – "Seasons (Waiting on You) [BBNG Reinterpretation]" (Future Islands single, 2014; tour, 2015)
 Dornik – "Drive" (BadBadNotGood Remix) (Dornik single, 2015)
Ol' Dirty Bastard – "Shimmy Shimmy Ya" with Ghostface Killah (tour, 2015)
Wu Tang Clan – "I Can't Go to Sleep" / "Tearz" / "Can It Be All So Simple" / "Wu Tang Clan Ain't Nuthing ta F' Wit" / "C.R.E.A.M." with Ghostface Killah (tour, 2015)
Earl Sweatshirt – "Huey" / "Grief" with Earl Sweatshirt (Jimmy Kimmel Live, 2015)
Kali Uchis – "Rush" (original track producer) (tour, 2015)
 Vince Guaraldi Trio – "Skating" and "Christmas Time is Here" with Choir! Choir! Choir! (A Charlie Brown Christmas) (The Strombo Show, 2015)
 TheSenseiBlue – "On the Map" with Mick Jenkins (Mick Jenkins single, 2016)
 Kaytranada – "Weight Off" (CBC Music, 2016; tour, 2017)
 The Beach Boys – "God Only Knows" with Jonti (Triple J's Like a Version, 2016)
 Goldlink – "Fall in Love" (original track producer) (tour, 2017–2018)
The Champs – "Tequila" (tour, 2017–2018)
 Denzel Curry – "Ultimate" / "Sick and Tired" with Denzel Curry (BBNG Sessions, 2017)
 Andy Shauf – "To You" (Late Night Tales: BadBadNotGood, 2017)
 Kanye West – "Ghost Town" (Louis Vuitton x Virgil Abloh Fashion Show, 2018)
 Majestics – "Key to Love (Is Understanding)" feat. Jonah Yano (single, 2019)
 Johnny Hammond – "The Chocolate Conquistadors" with MF Doom (single, 2020; tour, 2021-22)
 Madvillan – "Raid" (tour, 2021-22)
 Arthur Verocai – "Na Boca do Sol" (tour, 2021-22)

Production discography

Videography

Video albums

Music videos

See also 
Collaborative, side, and solo projects

 Jerry Paper (Toon Time Raw!, 2016)
 Charlotte Day Wilson (Stone Woman EP, 2018)
 Matty/Matthew Tavares (Déjàvu, 2018)
 Arrangement Studio (Vol. 1, 2018) (Alexander Sowinski with Leland Whitty and Duncan Hood)
 Disappearance at Clifton Hill score, 2019 (Alexander Sowinski and Leland Whitty)
 Matthew Tavares & Leland Whitty (Visions, 2020; January 12th, 2020)

Notes 
Releases

Charts

References 

Discographies of Canadian artists
Electronic music group discographies